Thayer Farmstead is a historic farm complex and national historic district located at Mexico in Oswego County, New York.  The district includes two contributing structures; the farmhouse and horse barn with small carriage shed.   Also on the property are a contributing The farmhouse is composed of a two-story central section flanked by symmetrical one story wings.  It is a frame building built about 1836.

It was listed on the National Register of Historic Places in 1991.

References

Farms on the National Register of Historic Places in New York (state)
Historic districts on the National Register of Historic Places in New York (state)
Historic districts in Oswego County, New York
National Register of Historic Places in Oswego County, New York